WBXC-CD is a Buzzr affiliate for Champaign, Illinois. It is owned by Gray Television, and broadcasts on UHF channel 18. It was formerly on channel 46 until December 20, 2019.

External links

BXC-CD
Television channels and stations established in 1995
Low-power television stations in the United States